Alauddin Ali (24 December 1952 – 9 August 2020) was a Bangladeshi music composer. He won the Bangladesh National Film Award for Best Music Director five times for the films Golapi Ekhon Traine (1978), Sundori (1979), Koshai (1980), Jogajog (1988) and Lakhe Ekta (1990). He won the Best Music Composer award for the film Laal Doriya (2002) and the Best Lyrics award for Premik (1985). Moreover, he won the Ifad Film Club Award and the Bachsas Award in the category of Best Music Director. He directed music for more than 300 films.

Early life and background
Alauddin Ali was born on 24 December 1952 in the Banshbari village of Tongibari Upazila of the Munshiganj District. His father was Ustad Jadab Ali and his mother's name was Johra Khatun.

Ali's father was a staff artiste at the Dhaka radio station. His uncle, Sadek Ali, and cousins Dhir Ali Miah, Mansur Ali, Yunus Ali and Momotaz Uddin, were music directors and composers there during the 1960s. His nephew Ali Akbar Rupu, son of his cousin Mansur Ali, was also a renowned music director of Bangladesh.

At the age of one year and six months, Alauddin Ali moved with his family to AGB Colony, Motijheel, Dhaka. This talented artist grew up in that colony with three brothers and two sisters. His first hand in music was with his younger uncle Sadek Ali. Later in 1986 he entered the film world as a musician. He started as an associate of Shaheed Altaf Mahmud and later worked with renowned composer Anwar Pervez for a long time.

Career

In 1964, Ali won the 'All Pakistan Children's Award' for violin from the then president Ayub Khan as a child musician. By 1967–68, besides practicing violin, he learnt the piano under music director Karim Shahabuddin. He worked under eminent music composers like Khan Ataur Rahman, Altaf Mahmud and Robin Ghosh.

In 1968, Ali joined as a film instrumentalist and assistant to composer Altaf Mahmud. Ali made his debut as a music composer through the country song O Amar Bangla Maa Tor. Ali's first film as a music director was Shondhikkhon (1975). In 1978, Ali made his breakthrough by composing songs for the film Golapi Ekhon Traine. He composed two songs "Achen Amar Moktar" and "Haire Kopal Mondo, Chokh Thakite Ondho" for that film.  Another film named Fakir Majnu Shah was released in the same year. The songs Premer Agune, Sobai Bole Boyosh Bare and Chokher Nojor Emni Koira were composed by Ali.

During his career he recorded several songs in Dhaka, Kolkata, Mumbai, Lahore and Karachi. He worked for HMV in India (now Saregama) in the 80's. A reputed French music company has included the background scores for the movie Surja Dighal Bari, composed by Alauddin Ali, in the curriculum of several music schools. He has also directed music for the film Padma Nadir Majhi directed by renowned director Goutam Ghose. He was the music director for the South Asian Games Ceremony in 1993 at Bangabandhu National Stadium, where over 8000 artistes sang to his tune.

He started an organization called 'LCS' on his own initiative, which works to protect artists ’royalties. Moreover, he also founded a production company called 'Ektara Multimedia Production' where various works related to music are done. The name of his music studio was Sruti.

Personal life
Ali was married three times. With Monowara Begum, he has three children - Afrin Ali, Ajmeri Ali Minu and Showkat Ali Rana. With Nazrul Sangeet singer Salma Sultana (d. 2016), he has a daughter Alif Alauddin, who is also a singer and media personality like her parents.

Until his death, Ali had  lived in Banasree, Dhaka with his wife Farzana Ali Mimi, a singer  and youngest daughter, Adrita Alauddin Rajkonna.

Interview

discography

Notable songs 
The number of songs composed by him is more than 5 thousand. In his career of more than four decades, he directed for playback songs of an average of 10 films every year. Some of the notable songs of Alauddin Ali are:

Awards

Death 
Ali had been suffering from pneumonia and blood infection for a long time. Alauddin Ali was first taken to Bangkok on 3 July 2015. After examination there, it was found that he had a tumor in his lung. Then he underwent treatment for cancer along with other physical problems. Earlier, he was admitted to hospital on several occasions. For a long time he was suffering from respiratory problems. He was treated in Bangladesh and Bangkok. He  also been received treatment at the Center for Rehabilitation of the Paralyzed in Savar for a long period. When his physical condition deteriorated, he was admitted to Universal Medical College Hospital in Mohakhali. Considering the situation, he was given life support. Ali died at 5:50 pm on 9 August 2020.  He was 67. He was buried at Mirpur Martyred Intellectuals Graveyard in Dhaka on 10 August 2020.

Notes

References

External links

Alauddin Ali on BMDb
The story of the Melody Emperor (in Bengali) on Bangla Movie Database (BMDb). Archived from the original on 11 August 2020.

1952 births
2020 deaths
Bangladeshi film score composers
Best Lyricist National Film Award (Bangladesh) winners
Burials at Mirpur Martyred Intellectual Graveyard
Best Music Director National Film Award (Bangladesh) winners
Best Music Composer National Film Award (Bangladesh) winners